José Cleylton de Morais dos Santos (born 19 March 1993), or simply Cleylton, is a Brazilian professional footballer who plays as a centre back for Ponte Preta.

Career
Cleylton began his career in Ferroviário, where he played the Copa Fares Lopes, a Ceará state competition, in 2012  and the Campeonato Cearense in 2013. In that same year, he joined Grêmio on loan.

Inter de Lages
Between 2014 and 2015, Cleylton joined clubs such as Cuiabá, Icasa and Novo Hamburgo. In 2015, he played the Campeonato Catarinense for the first time in his career after joining Inter de Lages.

References

External links

1993 births
Living people
Sportspeople from Fortaleza
Campeonato Brasileiro Série A players
Primeira Liga players
UAE Pro League players
Brazilian footballers
Ferroviário Atlético Clube (CE) players
Grêmio Foot-Ball Porto Alegrense players
Esporte Clube Novo Hamburgo players
Esporte Clube São José players
Esporte Clube Internacional de Lages players
Sport Club São Paulo players
Mirassol Futebol Clube players
C.F. Os Belenenses players
Belenenses SAD players
Hatta Club players
Expatriate footballers in Portugal
Expatriate footballers in the United Arab Emirates
Brazilian expatriate sportspeople in Portugal
Brazilian expatriate sportspeople in the United Arab Emirates
Association football central defenders